Hans Sauter (6 June 1925 – 1 October 2014) was an Austrian gymnast. He competed at the 1948, 1952, 1956 and the 1960 Summer Olympics.

References

1925 births
2014 deaths
Austrian male artistic gymnasts
Olympic gymnasts of Austria
Gymnasts at the 1948 Summer Olympics
Gymnasts at the 1952 Summer Olympics
Gymnasts at the 1956 Summer Olympics
Gymnasts at the 1960 Summer Olympics
People from Bregenz
Sportspeople from Vorarlberg
20th-century Austrian people